Cry Sugar is the third studio album by Hudson Mohawke, the alias of Scottish musician Ross Birchard. It was released on 12 August 2022 on Warp Records. It has received generally favorable critical reviews.

Background 
Cry Sugar is Birchard's first album of new material since his 2016 soundtrack for the video game Watch Dogs 2. In a press release, Birchard described the album as influenced by "American decadence" and the "apocalyptic film scores" of artists such as Vangelis and John Williams." Gospel and soul samples feature on much of the album, a quality rooted in Birchard's admiration for the tradition of hip-hop producers including DJ Premier, Pete Rock, and Just Blaze. Chad Hugo of the Neptunes contributed to the track "Redeem." The track "Stump" was inspired by Max Richter's "On the Nature of Daylight," heard in the soundtrack of Shutter Island (2010).

The cover artwork by Willehad Eilers depicts a debauched scene featuring the Stay-Puft Marshmallow Man in a thong. A music video for the single "Bicstan" was directed by Patti Harrison and Alan Resnick. Visuals for the "Megamix" and "Stump" releases were made by an artist named kingcon2k11.

Critical reception 

At Metacritic, which assigns a weighted average score out of 100 to reviews from mainstream critics, Cry Sugar received an average score of 79, based on 7 reviews, indicating "generally favourable reviews."

Louis Torracinta of Clash suggested the album "may take the cake for dance record of the year," adding that it "pulls from everywhere, all at once, swimming in the old and celebrating ecstatically the new." David Renshaw of The Fader stated that Birchard's "love of the wildly high BPM club sound of hardcore is blended with soulful gospel samples and epic movie-score landscapes to create a project that's irreverent, yet moving and hypnotic as well." Alexis Petridis of The Guardian stated that "there’s an edge-of-chaos tone to Cry Sugar, an album on which almost every sound fizzes with distortion and the music occasionally sounds on the verge of collapse." Gaby Wood of Resident Advisor called the album Birchard's "definitive solo effort" which "sees him re-emerge not as a jack but a master of all trades, fusing soul, jazz, happy hardcore and dance into vibrant, technicolor explosions of sound that succinctly capture the mood of our time in all its fitful glory and pain."

Track listing 
All tracks produced by Hudson Mohawke, except "Redeem", co-produced with Chad Hugo, and "Kpipe", co-produced with Káryyn.
Notes

 "Kpipe" is stylised in all caps.

Sample credits

 "Intentions" contains a sample of "I Pray", performed by Copyright, featuring Imaani.
 "Behold" contains a sample of "For Your Glory", performed by Tasha Cobbs.
 "Redeem" contains a sample of "Redeemed", performed by Rev. Gerald Thompson.
 "3 Sheets to the Wind" contains a sample of "Cry Sugar", performed by Dyson's Faces.
 "Some Buzz" contains samples of "God Has Smiled On Me", performed by Rev. James Cleveland, and "I Think I Am In Love With You", performed by Wee.

Personnel 
Credits adapted from official liner notes.

Musicians 

 Ross Birchard – instruments , production , additional keys 
 Cid Rim – additional drums 
 Yasmeen Al-Mazeedi – strings , additional strings 
 Kwes – piano 
 Rett Smith – guitar 
 Johan Lenox – string arrangement 
 Rag n Bone Broth Man – accordion 
 L. Ron Weasley – additional triangle 
 Jamaica Elrahar – vocals 
 Girth, Wind & Fire – percussion 
 Mette Towley – vocals 
 Clarence Coffee Jr – vocals 
 Dj JeffMillsShoes – scratches 
 Tayla Parx – additional vocal FX , vocals 
 Eli Teplin – additional keys 
 Tkay Maidza – vocals 
 Chad Hugo – production , additional keys 
 Ayatollah Hogmanay – flexatone 
 Káryyn – production , vocals 
 Jonty Chapeau – guiro 
 Sasha Alex Sloan – vocals

Technical 

 Ross Birchard – mixing 
 Austin Seltzer – mixing 
 Joker – mixing , mastering

Charts

References

External links 
 

2022 albums
Warp (record label) albums
Hudson Mohawke albums
Albums produced by Hudson Mohawke